Norroy and Ulster King of Arms is the provincial King of Arms at the College of Heralds with jurisdiction over England north of the Trent and Northern Ireland. The two offices of Norroy and Ulster were formerly separate. Norroy King of Arms is the older office, there being a reference as early as 1276 to a "King of Heralds beyond the Trent in the North". The name Norroy is derived from the French  meaning 'north king'. The office of  Ulster Principal King of Arms for All-Ireland was established in 1552 by King Edward VI to replace the older post of Ireland King of Arms, which had lapsed in 1487. 

Ulster King of Arms was not part of the College of Arms and did not fall under the jurisdiction of the Earl Marshal, being the heraldic authority for the Kingdom of Ireland (the jurisdiction of the College of Arms being the Kingdom of England and Lord Lyon's Office that of the Kingdom of Scotland).

Ulster was Registrar and King of Arms of the Order of St Patrick. Norroy and Ulster King of Arms now holds this position, though no new knights of that Order have been created since 1936, and the last surviving knight died in 1974. Heraldic matters in the Republic of Ireland are now handled by the office of the Chief Herald of Ireland (a part of the Genealogical Office in the National Library).

The arms of the new office of Norroy and Ulster King of Arms were devised in 1980 based on elements from the arms of the two former offices. They are blazoned: Quarterly Argent and Or a Cross Gules on a Chief per pale Azure and Gules a Lion passant guardant Or crowned with an open Crown between a Fleur-de-lis and a Harp Or.

The current Norroy and Ulster King of Arms is Robert Noel, who succeeded Timothy Duke in 2021.

Norroy Kings of Arms until 1943

Ulster Kings of Arms until 1943

Norroy and Ulster Kings of Arms from 1943

See also

Ireland King of Arms
Irish heraldry
Heraldry
Officer of Arms
Dr. Edward MacLysaght

References
Citations
 
Bibliography 
The College of Arms, Queen Victoria Street : being the sixteenth and final monograph of the London Survey Committee, Walter H. Godfrey, assisted by Sir Anthony Wagner, with a complete list of the officers of arms, prepared by H. Stanford London, (London, 1963)
A History of the College of Arms &c, Mark Noble, (London, 1804)
List of Ulster Kings of Arms

External links
The College of Arms
CUHGS Officer of Arms Index
Chief Herald of Ireland

Offices of the College of Arms
Irish officers of arms